The Australian Mathematical Society (AustMS) was founded in 1956 and is the national society of the mathematics profession in Australia. One of the Society's listed purposes is to promote the cause of mathematics in the community by representing the interests of the profession to government. The Society also publishes three mathematical journals. In December 2020, Ole Warnaar moved from President-Elect to President, succeeding Jacqui Ramagge, who was elected in 2018.

Society awards
 The Australian Mathematical Society Medal
 The George Szekeres Medal
 The Gavin Brown Prize
 The Mahler Lectureship
 The B.H. Neumann Prize

Society journals
The society publishes three journals through Cambridge University Press:
 Journal of the Australian Mathematical Society 
 ANZIAM Journal (formerly Series B, Applied Mathematics)
 Bulletin of the Australian Mathematical Society

ANZIAM
ANZIAM (Australia and New Zealand Industrial and Applied Mathematics) is a division of The Australian Mathematical Society (AustMS). Members are interested in applied mathematical research, mathematical applications in industry and business, and mathematics education at tertiary level.

The ANZIAM meeting is held annually at a different location in Australia or New Zealand.  The 2020 ANZIAM meeting was held in the Hunter Valley, NSW.

ANZIAM awards three medals to members on the basis of research achievements, activities enhancing applied or industrial mathematics, and contributions to ANZIAM: the J.H. Michell Medal (for early-career awardees), the Ernie Tuck Medal (mid-career), and the ANZIAM Medal.  In addition, each year the best student presentation is awarded the T.M. Cherry prize.  As a tongue in cheek response, each year the student body also awards the best non-student talk a Cherry Ripe chocolate bar.

Special Interest Groups 
ANZIAM has a number of special interest groups, based on specific research themes within applied mathematics: the Computational Mathematics Group, the Engineering Mathematics Group, Mathsport (concerned with the application of mathematics and computation to sport), the Mathematics in Industry Study Group, SIGMAOPT (concerning optimisation), and the Mathematical Biology Group.  Each Special Interest Group runs an annual or biennial workshop or conference.

See also
American Mathematical Society

References

Resources
 

1956 establishments in Australia
Mathematical societies
Learned societies of Australia